The women's synchronized 10 metre platform diving competition at the 2014 Asian Games in Incheon was held on 30 September at the Munhak Park Tae-hwan Aquatics Center.

Schedule
All times are Korea Standard Time (UTC+09:00)

Results

References 

Results

External links
 Official website

Diving at the 2014 Asian Games